The Women's 4 × 100 metre freestyle relay competition at the 2019 World Championships was held on 21 July 2019.

Records
Prior to the competition, the existing world and championship records were as follows.

The following new records were set during this competition.

Results

Heats
The heats were held at 12:21.

Final
The final was held at 21:33.

References

Women's 4 x 100 metre freestyle relay
2019 in women's swimming